The R43 is a provincial route in the Western Cape province of South Africa which connects Ceres with Gansbaai via Worcester, Botrivier and Hermanus. It is co-signed with the N2 for nine kilometres near Botrivier.

Route 
The R43 begins at a T-junction on the R46 between Ceres and Wolseley, situated at the southwestern entrance to Michell's Pass. It runs southwards down the Breede River valley to Worcester, where it briefly overlaps the N1. From Worcester it passes around the Brandvlei Dam to Villiersdorp, and then on to meet the N2. The R43 designation overlaps the N2 for 9 kilometers to Botrivier, where it continues south down the Bot River valley and then eastwards along the coast to Hermanus. From Hermanus the route continues up the Klein River valley to Stanford, before turning south again, rejoining the coast at Gansbaai. From Gansbaai it continues along the coast past Pearly Beach to end in open countryside at Die Dam, close to the entrance to the Quoin Point section of the Walker Bay Nature Reserve.

References

External links
 Routes Travel Info

43
Provincial routes in South Africa